The Australian Defence Force Ensign is a flag of Australia which represents the tri-service Australian Defence Force. The design was formally recognised by the Australian Government as a flag of Australia with an amendment to the Flags Act 1953 passed on 14 April 2000.

The Navy and Air Force also have individual ensigns: the Royal Australian Navy Ensign and the Royal Australian Air Force Ensign. The Army has historically used the Flag of Australia. The Defence Ensign is supposed to be used in the case of joint activities. It is made up of three vertical bands: dark blue, red and light blue, representing the Navy, Army and Air Force respectively. In the centre is a large joint services emblem in yellow. This emblem features an anchor, crossed swords and a wedge-tailed eagle with wings outstretched combined above a boomerang and below a crest featuring a seven pointed Commonwealth Star.  The flag is similar to that of the United Kingdom's Ministry of Defence, first utilised in 1956 and is a common colour-scheme in British-aligned territories, used by fellow Commonwealth members Cyprus, India, Kenya and Nigeria.

The rank flags of staff with joint services commands, such as the Chief of Defence Force and the Minister for Defence, are derived from the Defence Force Ensign.

References

External links

Flags of Australia
National symbols of Australia
Military of Australia
2000 establishments in Australia
Australian Defence Force
Military flags